David E. Dutremble is an American politician and firefighter from Maine. Dutremble is a Democratic State Senator from Maine's 4th District, representing part of York County, including the city of Biddeford and the neighboring towns of Kennebunkport, Arundel and Kennebunk. In 2012, he beat Independent James Booth to become State Senator, replacing fellow Democrat Nancy Sullivan, who was unable to seek re-election due to term limits. In 2012, Dutremble was named chair of the Inland Fisheries and Wildlife committee.

He resigned his seat on January 27, 2016, after already having said he would not seek reelection. He stated that he wished to focus on treatment for alcohol abuse.

Personal
Dutremble is a Lieutenant Firefighter and EMT with the Biddeford Fire Department as well as a Limited Master Electrician in housewiring. He attended York County Community College for licensure. Dutremble is the cousin of Dennis L. Dutremble, who served 8 terms in the Maine Legislature, including a term as State Senate President.

References

Year of birth missing (living people)
Living people
Democratic Party Maine state senators
Politicians from Biddeford, Maine
York County Community College alumni
American firefighters
American electricians
21st-century American politicians